The Cesar River (Rio Cesar) is a river in southern Chile, a right tributary of the Rio Risopatrón in the Palena River drainage. It enters the Rio Risopatrón north of Lake Risopatrón.

Notes and references

Rivers of Chile